The 1937 North Dakota Fighting Sioux football team, also known as the Nodaks, was an American football team that represented the University of North Dakota in the North Central Conference (NCC) during the 1937 college football season. In its tenth year under head coach Charles A. West, the team compiled a 4–4 record (3–0 against NCC opponents), won the conference championship, and outscored opponents by a total of 97 to 79.

Schedule

References

North Dakota
North Dakota Fighting Hawks football seasons
North Central Conference football champion seasons
North Dakota Fighting Sioux football